Brown Olson (March 31, 1850 – March 8, 1897) was an American farmer and politician.

Born in the town of Christiana, Vernon County, Wisconsin, Olson was the first white child to be born in the town. Olson was a farmer. He served as chairman of the Christiana Town Board and was a Republican. In 1891, Olson served in the Wisconsin State Assembly.

Notes

External links

1850 births
1897 deaths
People from Vernon County, Wisconsin
Farmers from Wisconsin
Mayors of places in Wisconsin
Republican Party members of the Wisconsin State Assembly
19th-century American politicians
Burials in Wisconsin